Mountain Vista Governor's School for Science, Math & Technology (commonly Mountain Vista or MVGS) is one of Virginia's 18 state-initiated governor's schools, serving primarily 10th, 11th, and 12th graders. The school is composed of two campuses, one each in Middletown, Virginia, United States and Warrenton, Virginia, United States. Admission is determined via an application process.

History
Planning for Mountain Vista began in 2003; its participating counties were one of the last in the state not covered by an existing academic-year governor's school or similar program.  The participating school systems surveyed parents and students within their respective counties to gauge interest. A plan for implementation was created and put into motion;  A committee was formed, and approval was sought from the Virginia Department of Education.  A first review of the plan was presented to the Virginia Department of Education at their January 11, 2006 meeting.  
The funding for MVGS (a total of $190,544) was first approved in the 2006-2008 Biennial Budget passed by the Virginia House of Delegates.

On January 11, the estimated portion of the school budget that the participating counties had to pay was approximately $216,527; it was divided among each of the counties.   Each county's school board was responsible for approving both the funding and a 3-year commitment in order for the project to continue. Each jurisdiction was made responsible for the funding for each slot at the governor's school allocated to them.

In May 2006, Dr. Rosanne Williamson was named director of Mountain Vista, and she assumed the post on July 1.

On January 15, 2011,  students from both campuses travelled with their teachers to Richmond, where they participated in the 2011 Volvo Construction Challenge. The Middletown team of four students placed second in the Transportation Infrastructure challenge.

Admission
Each participating county has a local committee that decides who attends from that county.  Students interested must complete an application and submit transcripts and two written essays.  The applications along with teacher recommendations are reviewed by the local committee and admission decisions are made.

Participating localities
The number of slots at the governor's school allocated to each jurisdiction, as of September 14, 2006:

Frederick & Fauquier (30)
Culpeper (15)
Winchester (13)
Warren (15)
Rappahannock (4)

Facilities
The Mountain Vista Governor's School program does not have a classroom facility of its own.  Instead, students travel to Lord Fairfax Community College to take courses offered by the program, then the students return to their home schools and maintain eligibility for sports and extracurricular activities there. The area served by Mountain Vista is too large for a single location to which busing all students would be practical; LFCC was chosen because it has a campus on each end of the area covered by Mountain Vista. The two sites are connected via videoconferencing that allow them to interact with each other.

In addition, all Mountain Vista students are given laptops by their respective county for use year round. During the 06-07 and 07-08 school years, the school used the Blackboard Academic Suite of e-Education software designed to allow the students to submit and retrieve notes and assignments on snow days or other missed days of school, and to provide virtual office hours for instructors. Frederick County Public Schools provided the means of sharing their purchased BAS with MVGS. However, during the 2008-09 school year, Frederick County switched to the ANGEL Learning Management System, causing Mountain Vista to change to ANGEL along with it. MVGS also used a private discussion board for communication between staff and students. Then, in the 2011-2012 school year, MVGS decided to change from ANGEL to Google sites due to technical issues with ANGEL. Google groups were created as classes and Google mail sent out homework quickly and efficiently.

Academics
The Mountain Vista curriculum was designed to be a college level mathematics and science program providing a solid basis for doing research and making connections between disciplines. The classes are connected in a way that when a topic is being taught in physics, a similar concept is being taught in math and humanities is discussing social applications and ramifications of the subject.  Most of the courses have homework assignments assigned during the summer and due on the first day of class making learning a year-round activity.   A number of MVGS classes are Dual Enrollment, AP, or both, giving the students the ability to earn college credits while still in high school.

The courses offered are:

Science:
MVGS Physics I: Mechanics
MVGS Physics II: Electricity and Magnetism
MVGS Chemistry
Mathematics:
MVGS Math Analysis (Pre-Calculus)
MVGS First Year Calculus
MVGS Second Year Calculus with Topics in Multivariable
MVGS Statistics
Humanities:
MVGS Humanities I: The Power of Thought / English 11
MVGS Humanities II: Applying the Power of Persuasion to World Issues /Government
Research:
MVGS Research I:  Introduction to the Fundamentals of the Research Process
MVGS Research II:  Exploration of Cutting-Edge Science and Technology Fields (Applied Research)

Starting in the 2012-2013 school year, the follow courses will also be offered:
Biology:
MVGS Biology I: Introduction
MVGS Biology II: Advanced Topics (Genetics, Ecology, and the Physiology of Organisms)

Along with in class work, classes include projects that allow for hands on problem solving and collaboration with other students like a water balloon launch competition.

Graduates

The first class graduated in 2007. Almost half of the students reportedly attend reputable Virginia schools, such as the University of Virginia, College of William and Mary, Virginia Commonwealth University, James Madison University, and Virginia Tech, some becoming Echols scholars. Alumni have also attended Ivy League and U.S. military colleges. In the class of 2011, some alumni attended Yale University, Johns Hopkins University, Washington University in St. Louis, Vanderbilt University, University of California, Berkeley, Tufts University, and Purdue University.

See also
 Governor's Schools (Virginia)
 Magnet School

References

External links
 Mountain Vista Governor's School for Science, Math and Technology

Magnet schools in Virginia
Public high schools in Virginia
Education in Clarke County, Virginia
Education in Culpeper County, Virginia
Schools in Fauquier County, Virginia
Schools in Frederick County, Virginia
Schools in Warren County, Virginia
Education in Rappahannock County, Virginia
Education in Winchester, Virginia
Educational institutions established in 2006
2006 establishments in Virginia